Edward Ford may refer to:

 Edward Ford (surgeon) (1746–1809), British surgeon
 Edward Ford (courtier) (1910–2006), courtier in the Royal Household of King George VI and Queen Elizabeth II
 Edward Ford (soldier) (1605–1670), English soldier and inventor
 Edward Ford (physician) (1902–1986), Australian soldier, academic and physician
 Edward Onslow Ford (1852–1901), English sculptor
 Edward Ford (born 1914), brother of United States President Gerald Ford
 Edward Hastings Ford (1887–1970), vaudeville comedian who created the radio show Can You Top This?
 Edward E. Ford (1894–1963), American philanthropist and businessman serving on the board of directors of IBM.
Whitey Ford (Edward Charles Ford, 1928–2020), American baseball pitcher

See also
Edwin Ford (1861 – 1933), American founder of The Ford Meter Box Company, Inc.
Eddie Ford (footballer, born 1917) (1917 – 1946), Australian rules footballer for Richmond
Eddie Ford (footballer, born 2002) (born 2002), Australian rules footballer for North Melbourne